Jabal al-Lawz is a sub-district located in Attyal District, Sana'a Governorate, Yemen. Jabal al-Lawz had a population of 13432 according to the 2004 census.

References 

Sub-districts in Attyal District